Lavrente Indico Diaz (born December 30, 1958) is a Filipino independent filmmaker and former film critic. He is frequently known as one of the key members of the slow cinema movement, and has made several of the longest narrative films on record. Diaz is one of the most critically acclaimed contemporary Filipino filmmakers.  

Diaz started making films in the late 1990s. His first international exposure was at the Hong Kong International Film Festival in 1999 with his directorial debut Serafin Geronimo: Ang Kriminal ng Baryo Concepcion (The Criminal of Barrio Concepcion). The Hong Kong event went on to present his next two features: Naked Under the Moon in 2000 and Batang West Side in 2001. European film festivals only caught on with Norte, the End of History (2013), which was entered into the Un Certain Regard section of the 2013 Cannes Film Festival and received much critical praise.

Diaz's subsequent films have likewise received positive critical attention and many awards. From What Is Before (2014) won the Golden Leopard at the 2014 Locarno International Film Festival; A Lullaby to the Sorrowful Mystery (2016) competed for the Golden Bear at the 66th Berlin International Film Festival and won the Alfred Bauer Prize(Silver Bear); and The Woman Who Left (2016) competed at the 73rd Venice International Film Festival and won the Golden Lion. He received the FAMAS Lifetime Achievement Award in 2018. He is the recipient of 2021's Natatanging Gawad Urian (Gawad Urian Lifetime Achievement Award).

Education
Diaz has an economics degree from Notre Dame University in Cotabato City.

Career
He has won several international awards such as the award for Best Picture at the Singapore International Film Festival, the Independent Film Festival of Brussels and Gawad Urian in 2002 and Netpac Jury Prize and Best Acting Ensemble (2001 Cinemanila International Film Festival) for his film Batang West Side (including Best Director, Best Screenplay, Best Actor, Best Supporting Actor, Best Cinematography, Best Production Design, Best Music, Best Sound at the Urian), in Gawad Urian in 2005 for the film Ebolusyon ng Isang Pamilyang Pilipino (Evolution of a Filipino Family), and Special Jury Prize at the Fribourg International Film Festival in 2006 for Heremias, Book One.

His films often tackle the issues regarding the current social and political state of the Philippines. His film Kagadanan sa Banwaan ning mga Engkanto (Death in the Land of Encantos), the Closing Film of the orizzonti section of the Venice Film Festival 2007, was awarded with a Golden Lion Special Mention. Death in the Land of Encantos was also in competition at the Artistic Innovation Award (Visions) of the Toronto International Film Festival 2007. He was three Palanca Memorial Awards for Literature recognitions (a second place (1990) and an honorable mention (1991) for short stories, and third place (1997) for screenplay). His film Melancholia won the Orizzonti Grand Prize at the 65th Venice International Film Festival in 2008. In January 2011 he joined the board of directors for Cine Foundation International.

He went back in 2011 at the Venice International Film Festival for his film Siglo ng Pagluluwal (Century of Birthing) and which earned the Grand Jury Prize at the 13th Cinemanila International Film Festival. The following year, his film Florentina Hubaldo, CTE won Best Asian Film at the Jeonju International Film Festival and gained the On-Screen Award at the Images Festival.

His 2013 film Norte, the End of History was screened in the Un Certain Regard section of the 66th Cannes Film Festival. He received the Golden Leopard at the 2014 Locarno International Film Festival for From What Is Before. At the 2016 Berlin International Film Festival, his film A Lullaby to the Sorrowful Mystery was awarded the Silver Bear Alfred Bauer Prize. In the same year, he also received the Golden Lion at the 73rd Venice International Film Festival for The Woman Who Left.

Diaz has made crime stories, ghost stories and a musical. On the topic of genre Diaz has said, "it’s nice to dwell on genres because there are formulas there and you can work with them. But at the same time you’re free to break them."

He is a recipient of the Guggenheim Fellowship in 2010, the Prince Claus Award of the Netherlands in 2014 and The Radcliffe Fellowship of Harvard University, 2016–2017.

Diaz was invited by the Academy of Motion Picture Arts and Sciences to join as a member in July 2017.
 
He presents his latest film at the Venice Film Festival out of competition, When the Waves Are Gone.

Filmography 
{| class="wikitable sortable plainrowheaders" style="margin-right: 0;"
|-
! rowspan="2" scope="col" width="20%"| Title
! rowspan="2" scope="col" width="4%"| Year
! colspan="5" scope="col" | Functioned as
! rowspan="2" scope="col" width="30%" class="unsortable" | Notes
! rowspan="2" scope="col" width="4%"| Length
! width="2%" rowspan="2" scope="col" class="unsortable" |
|-
! scope="col" width="6%"| Director
! scope="col" width="6%"| Writer
! scope="col" width="6%"| Producer
! scope="col" width="6%"| Editor
! scope="col" width="6%"| Cinematographer
|-
! scope="row"| Mabuting Kaibigan, Masamang Kaaway
| 1991
| 
| 
| 
| 
| 
| Co-written with Tony Mortel, Jose Bartolome and Manny Buising.
| 110 min (1:50)
| 
|-
! scope="row"| Galvez: Hanggang sa Dulo ng Mundo Hahanapin Kita
| 1993
| 
| 
| 
| 
| 
| Co-written with Henry Nadong.
| 103 min (1:43)
| 
|-
! scope="row"| Serafin Geronimo: Ang Kriminal ng Baryo Concepcion
| 1998
| 
| 
| 
| 
| 
| Directorial debut; 
English title: The Criminal of Barrio Concepcion.
| 132 min (2:12)
| style="text-align: center;" | 
|-
! scope="row"| Burger Boy's'
| rowspan="2" | 1999
| 
| 
| 
| 
| 
| 
| 112 min (1:52)
| style="text-align: center;" | 
|-
! scope="row"| Hubad sa Ilalim ng Buwan| 
| 
| 
| 
| 
| English title: Naked Under the Moon.
| 110 min (1:50)
| style="text-align: center;" | 
|-
! scope="row"| Batang West Side| 2001
| 
| 
| 
| 
|
| English title: West Side Avenue.
| 315 min (5:15)
| style="text-align: center;" | 
|-
! scope="row"| Hesus, Rebolusyunaryo| 2002
| 
| 
| 
| 
| 
| English title: Hesus the Revolutionary| 112 min (1:52)
| style="text-align: center;" | 
|-
! scope="row"| Ebolusyon ng Isang Pamilyang Pilipino| 2004
| 
| 
| 
| 
| 
| English title: Evolution of a Filipino Family.
| 647 min (10:47)
| style="text-align: center;" | 
|-
! scope="row"| Heremias (Unang Aklat: Ang Alamat ng Prinsesang Bayawak)| 2006
| 
| 
| 
| 
| 
| English title: Heremias (Book One: Legend of the Lizard Princess).
| 519 min (8:39)
| style="text-align: center;" | 
|-
! scope="row"| Kagadanan Sa Banwaan Ning Mga Engkanto| 2007
| 
| 
| 
| 
| 
| English title: Death in the Land of Encantos.
| 541 min (9:01)
| style="text-align: center;" | 
|-
! scope="row"| Melancholia| 2008
| 
| 
| 
| 
| 
| 
| 447 min (7:27)
| style="text-align: center;" | 
|-
! scope="row"| Walang Alaala ang mga Paru-Paro| 2009
| 
| 
| 
| 
| 
| Short film 
English title: Butterflies Have No Memories.
| 40 min
| style="text-align: center;" | 
|-
! scope="row"| Babae ng Hangin| rowspan="3" | 2011
| 
| 
| 
| 
| 
| Incomplete
English title: Woman of the Wind.
| 
| style="text-align: center;" |
|-
! scope="row"| Siglo ng Pagluluwal| 
| 
| 
| 
| 
| English title: Century of Birthingalso composer.
| 359 min (5:59)
| style="text-align: center;" | 
|-
! scope="row"| Elehiya sa Dumalaw Mula sa Himagsikan.
| 
| 
| 
| 
| 
| English title: Elegy to the Visitor from the Revolution.
| 80 min (1:20)
| style="text-align: center;" | 
|-
! scope="row"| Florentina Hubaldo, CTE| 2012
| 
| 
| 
| 
| 
| 
| 367 min (6:07)
| style="text-align: center;" | 
|-
! scope="row"| Norte, Hangganan ng Kasaysayan| 2013
| 
| 
| 
| 
| 
| English title: Norte, the End of History.

co-written with Rody Vera; adapted from the novel Crime and Punishment by Fyodor Dostoyevsky.

Nominated - Best International Film at the 2015 Independent Spirit Awards.

Nominated - Un Certain Regard at the 2013 Cannes Film Festival.
| 250 min (4:10)
| style="text-align: center;" | 
|-
! scope="row"| Mula sa Kung Ano ang Noon| rowspan="2" | 2014
| 
| 
| 
| 
| 
| English title: From What Is Before.
Winner Golden Leopard at the 2014 Locarno Film Festival
| 339 min (5:39)
| style="text-align: center;" | 
|-
! scope="row"| Mga Anak ng Unos: Unang Aklat| 
| 
| 
| 
| 
| Documentary
English title: Storm Children: Book One.
| 143 min (2:23)
| style="text-align: center;" | 
|-
! scope="row"| Fragment| 2015
| 
| 
| 
| 
| 
| "Ang Araw Bago ang Wakas..." segment 
English title: The Day Before the End.
| 130 hr (2:10) (film); 16 min (segment)
| style="text-align: center;" | 
|-
! scope="row"| Hele sa Hiwagang Hapis| rowspan="2" | 2016
| 
| 
| 
| 
| 
| English title: A Lullaby to the Sorrowful MysteryPremiered at 2016 Berlin Film Festival In Competition
| 489 min (8:09)
| style="text-align: center;" | 
|-
! scope="row"| Ang Babaeng Humayo| 
| 
| 
| 
| 
| English title: The Woman Who Left.

Adapted from the short story God Sees the Truth, But Waits by Leo Tolstoy.

Winner Golden Lion at the 2016 Venice Film Festival.
| 229 min (3:49)
| style="text-align: center;" | 
|-
! scope="row"| Ang Panahon ng Halimaw| rowspan="2" | 2018
| 
| 
| 
|
|
| English title: Season of the DevilAlso composer.

Premiered at 2018 Berlin Film Festival In Competition
| 234 min (3:54)
| 
|-
! scope="row"| Lakbayan| 
| 
| 
| 
| 
| "Hugaw/Dirt" segment
English title: Journey| 118 min (1:58)
| style="text-align: center;" | 
|-
! scope="row"| Ang Hupa| 2019
| 
| 
| 
| 
| 
|English title: The Halt| 283 min (4:43)
| style="text-align: center;" | 
|-
! scope="row"| Lahi, Hayop| 2020
| 
| 
| 
| 
| 
| English title: Genus PanRe-edited material from an abandoned 2014 feature film.
| 157 min (2:37)
| 
|-
! scope="row"| Historya ni Ha| 2021
| 
| 
| 
| 
| 
| English title: History of Ha| 273 min (4:33)
| 
|-
! scope="row"| Isang Salaysay ng Karahasang Pilipino| rowspan="2" | 2022
| 
| 
| 
| 
| 
| English title: A Tale of Filipino Violence;
Adapted from Ricardo Lee's short story and screenplay of "Servando Magdamag"; Premiered at FidMarseillse.
| 409 min (6:49)
| 
|-
! scope="row"| Kapag Wala Nang Mga Alon| 
| 
| 
| 
| 
| English title: When the Waves are Gone;Premiere 2022 Venice Film Festival 
| 187 min (3:07)
| 
|}

Awards and nominations

References

 Further publications 

 Diaz, Lav. Batang West Side, Edition Filmmuseum, 2-disc set, 2022 Österreichisches Filmmuseum
 Guarneri, Michael. Conversations with Lav Diaz. Piretti - Bologna - 2021
 Corinne Maury, Olivier Zuchuat (dir.), Lav Diaz : faire face'', Paris, Post Editions, 2022, 365 p.

External links

1958 births
Filipino film directors
Filipino screenwriters
Living people
People from Maguindanao
Directors of Golden Lion winners